(Middle Welsh for "Fair Family") is the most usual term in Wales for the mythological creatures corresponding to the fairy folk of English and Continental folklore and the Irish .

Origins

The term  is first attested in a poem attributed to the 14th-century , in which the principal character gets perilously but comically lost while going to visit his girlfriend: "" ("(The) weak enchantment (now) flees, / (the) long burden of the Tylwyth Teg (departs) into the mist").

Attributes
They dance and make fairy rings and they live underground or under the water. They bestow riches on those they favour but these gifts vanish if they are spoken of, and fairy maidens may become the wives of human men. These fairy wives are however still bound by traditional taboos. They must be careful to avoid touching iron or they will vanish back to their realm never to be seen by their husbands again.

A changeling story tells of a woman whose three-year-old son was stolen by the fairies and she was given a threefold instruction by a "cunning man" (magician) on how to get him back. She removed the top from a raw egg and began stirring the contents, and as the changeling watched her do this certain comments he made established his otherworldly identity. She then went to a crossroads at midnight during the full moon and observed a fairy raid in order to confirm that her son was with them. Lastly she obtained a black hen and without plucking it she roasted it over a wood fire until every feather dropped off. The changeling then disappeared and her son was returned to her.

The  (singular ) inhabit groves and valleys and are similar to English elves. Their food consists of toadstools and fairy butter (a type of fungus) and they wear digitalis bell flowers as gloves. They are ruled by Queen Mab and bring prosperity to those they favour.

In popular culture 

 Frank Herbert's Heretics of Dune includes two characters called Tylwyth Waff and Miles Teg.
 Jim Butcher's short story "Curses" set in the Harry Dresden universe has the  responsible for the Curse of the Billy Goat on the Chicago Cubs.
 Seanan McGuire's October Daye series of books features a  character as an alchemist.
 In the third season of the HBO series True Blood, which itself is based on The Southern Vampire Mysteries by Charlaine Harris, Sookie Stackhouse (Anna Paquin) finally learns that she is a human/faery hybrid and therefore why she possesses certain unique special abilities. The "Ellyllon" is one of the terms used to describe what her race is, as well as the terms Finodrerr, the Old People, the Fae and Aliens.

References

Further reading
 
 
 

Fictional characters introduced in the 14th century
Elves
Fairies
Welsh folklore